The University of Roehampton, London, formerly Roehampton Institute of Higher Education, is a public university in the United Kingdom, situated on three major sites in Roehampton, in the London Borough of Wandsworth. The University traces its roots to four institutions founded in the 1800s, which today make up to university's constituent colleges, around which student accommodation is centred: Digby Stuart College, Froebel College, Southlands College and Whitelands College. 

Between 2000 and 2004, Roehampton, together with the University of Surrey, partnered as the Federal University of Surrey. In 2004, Roehampton became an independent university, and in 2011, it was renamed the University of Roehampton. The university is one of the post-1992 universities. Roehampton is a member of the European University Association and Universities UK.

Roehampton's academic faculties include the Faculty of Business and Law, Faculty of Arts, Faculty of Education, Faculty of Humanities and Social Sciences, Faculty of Life and Health Sciences and Faculty of Psychology.

History

The university has its roots in the traditions of its four constituent colleges, all of which were founded in the 19th century as women's teacher training colleges:

 Whitelands College – Founded in 1841, the college is one of the five oldest institutions for training educators in England. A flagship women's college of the Church of England, it was the first college of higher education in the UK to admit women. It occupies a 14-acre site overlooking Richmond Park.
 Southlands College – Established in by the Methodist Church in 1872, originally in Battersea, as a teacher training college for women, becoming coeducational in 1965. Today it is the location of the University's Business School, and its Department of Media, Culture and Language.
 Digby Stuart College – Established in 1874 as a teacher training college for Roman Catholic women. The college owes its existence to the Society of the Sacred Heart, whose members continue to support the college and the university.
 Froebel College – Founded in 1892, the college was established to further the values of Friedrich Fröbel, the German educationalist who pioneered a holistic view of child development. It is one of the UK's major centres for initial teacher training.

All four colleges were founded to address the need to educate poor and disadvantaged children. In 1976, the four colleges joined to form the Roehampton Institute of Higher Education. Its first Rector was Kevin Keohane, the former Professor of Science Education at Chelsea College of Science and Technology.

Since 2011, the university has been branded the University of Roehampton. However, its legal name remains Roehampton University. In 2012 the last college, Whitelands, was legally merged with the university, bringing all the colleges into a common management structure.

Academic departments
Faculty of Business and Law (including Roehampton University Business School and Roehampton University Law School)
School of Arts (including Computing)
School of Education
School of Humanities and Social Sciences
School of Life and Health Sciences (including Nursing)
School of Psychology

Reputation and standing for research

In the 2008 Research Assessment Exercise (RAE), Roehampton University was ranked first in the country for Dance and Biological Anthropology. Ten out of the fifteen subjects that submitted work included at least some proportion of research judged to be world-leading in terms of its originality and significance. 78% of all research undertaken at the university was of an international standard.

According to Higher Education Funding Council for England's 2014 Research Excellence Framework (REF), the university is the most research-intensive post-1992 university in the UK. Roehampton submitted work by more than two-thirds of its academic staff, in 13 subject areas. This is the highest proportion of any post-1992 university. Dance was the top performing subject, with 94% of research rated 4* and 3* – making it the highest-rated department in its subject area in the UK.  Roehampton was also ranked 3rd in London for research quality in Education, and 4th for English. Roehampton was the strongest-performing university in London in these subject areas. Overall, 66 per cent Roehampton's research was judged either world-leading or internationally excellent.

In the REF 2021, 218 staff were submitted in 12 areas and were graded 3*-4* overall.

Proposed restructuring
In May 2022, 226 academics (almost half the academic staff at the University of Roehampton) received an email from Vice Chancellor, Professor Jean-Noël Ezingeard, informing them that their jobs were at risk. The email proposed wide-ranging restructuring and redundancies across the university. The proposed job losses target the arts and humanities and would devastate longstanding and acclaimed teaching and research in subject areas such as creative writing, drama, and classics. The Member of Parliament for Putney, Roehampton and Southfields, Fleur Anderson, wrote to Professor Ezingeard on 6 June 2022 expressing her concern over the proposed restructuring and redundancies. Amongst the concerns laid out by Anderson in her letter were that the university's proposals amount to the practice of 'fire and rehire'; that the proposals would have a negative impact on current and prospective students; and that the proposed restructuring of the university would limit working-class education and opportunities, particularly in the creative fields.

Facilities

Library
The university opened a new library in 2017, designed by Feilden Clegg Bradley Studios. The library houses the Jewish Resource Centre Collection, the Centre for Marian Studies, a collection of resources covering all matters regarding the Virgin Mary, the Queen's Archive, featuring material on authority and governance within the Roman Catholic Church in the UK and the Richmal Crompton Collection of books and archive material accumulated during the lifetime of the author Richmal Crompton (1890–1969).

Specialist facilities
The university has a biomechanics laboratory, which is based at Whitelands College. The lab is equipped with advanced optical motion analysis systems, Kistler force plates, Biometrics Electromyography equipment, Goniometers and 3D Accelerometers, Motion Tracking Sensors, and Physiological assessment equipment.

E-sports
The university has an e-sports arena, with 20 PCs and facilities for live streaming and video editing. The University of Roehampton was the first university in the UK to offer e-sports scholarships.

Accommodation

Digby Stuart College
 Bede House
 Elm Grove Hall
Lee House
Newman House
Shaw House

Froebel College
 Aspen House
 Chadwick Hall - Shortlisted for the Stirling Prize for excellence in architecture in 2018.
 Garden Court
 Lawrence
 Linden House
 Mount Clare
 New Court
 Old Court
Willow House

Southlands College
 Aldersgate and Epworth Court
 Wesley Hall

Whitelands College
 Beverley and Cheltenham
 Durham and Gilesgate
 Kings and Melrose
 Sutherland and Walpole

Roehampton Students' Union (RSU)
The RSU is the main organisation of student representation at the university. It is led by student officers elected by the student body and aims to promote the interests and welfare of all those studying at Roehampton. It is also a focal point for social activities and is responsible for organising events like the Summer Ball, Summer Ball being the biggest event of the academic year. Attracting over 2000 students and held on campus, the event attracts a variety of musical and entertainment acts. The RSU also organises nights out in London, some of these consist of the Clapham grand once a month, fez club Putney on Wednesday nights and the union's special event the Bop hosted at the union bar. The Union itself has 12 different bars, cafes and restaurants spread around the campus.

In September 2013 Roehampton Students' Union was awarded £226,900 from NUS Students' Green Fund for a sustainability initiative with a focus on urban food growing. The project is called Growhampton. Growhampton runs a cafe, the Hive, alongside a regular market day, where food produced by students and small local organisations is sold.  In June 2015, Wandsworth Council awarded Growhampton funds to launch a food education outreach programme, which now operates in Wandsworth schools, youth groups and community groups, with a focus on food growing. Growhampton also works directly with a local charities, including Regenerate and Paradise Co-op.

The Union runs Fresh Network for student media.

Third Row Dance Company

The Third Row Dance Company is a company for undergraduate dance students, led by students. Founded in 2008, the company is made up of dancers selected through an audition process. It commissions professional choreographers to create works, in order for the dancers to gain experience of the professional dance world, which are performed to other students both within the university and outside. Guest choreographers have included Australian dancer and choreographer Daniel Riley, formerly of Bangarra Dance Theatre and since late 2021 artistic director of the Australian Dance Theatre.

People associated with Roehampton University

Notable alumni 

Amongst the alumni of the University of Roehampton, and other institutions that fall under that banner are:

 Niki and Sammy Albon, YouTubers
 Toby Anstis, radio DJ
 Mike Bailey, actor
 Lyn Brown, a politician
 Jack Garratt, singer
 Jon Gilbert, bibliographer
 Jon Goodman, footballer
 Matt Henry, actor and singer
 Rachel John, actress and singer
 Allyson Jule, professor/author
 Daniel Kitson, comedian
 Samira Makhmalbaf, filmmaker
 Helen Metcalf, educator/politician
 Alize Mounter, former Miss England
 Beverly Naya, actress
 Brody Neuenschwander, artist and calligrapher
 Danielle Perez, former Miss Gibraltar
 Rita Ramnani, actress and dancer
 Chris Robshaw, Harlequins and England rugby captain
 David Rossdale, Bishop of Grimsby
 Djoumin Sangaré, footballer
 Darren Shan, author
 Joe Tillen, footballer
 Deepak Tripathi, historian
 Lamorna Watts, actress
 Tim Woolcock, painter

Chancellors and vice-chancellors
Baroness Sandip Verma was appointed the Chancellor in 2022.  Dame Jacqueline Wilson was appointed Chancellor of the university in August 2014, she succeeded the first Chancellor John Simpson (2004–2014). Jacqueline Wilson retired from the role in 2020. Jacqueline is also a Teaching Fellow, who teaches modules.

The Vice-Chancellor of the university is Professor Jean-Noël Ezingeard, who succeeded Professor Paul O'Prey in May 2019. Former Vice-Chancellor O'Prey was appointed Commander of the Order of the British Empire (CBE) in the Queen's 90th Birthday Honours list for his services to higher education and the literary history of the First World War.

See also
 Armorial of UK universities
 College of Education
 List of universities in the UK

References

External links

Official website
Roehampton University Students' Union

 
1975 establishments in England
Educational institutions established in 1975
Education in the London Borough of Wandsworth
Roehampton
Roehampton
Roehampton